James Hill "Hamish" Barber  (28 May 1933 – 26 August 2007) was a doctor and medical academic. He was the first professor of general practice at the University of Glasgow and wrote the first comprehensive textbook in this field.

Early life
Barber was born on 28 May 1933 in Dunfermline, Scotland.

Medical career
Barber qualified from the University of Edinburgh in 1957. He gained a MD in 1966 with a thesis entitled A Study of Asymptomatic Bacteriuria in General Practice.

In 1972 he was appointed as senior lecturer in the organisation of medical care at the University of Glasgow. In 1974 he became the first professor of General Practice at the University. Computer-assisted learning was introduced during his tenure.

Together with Andrew Boddy, he wrote The Textbook of General Practice Medicine which was published in 1975. At just over 350 pages it was the first comprehensive textbook of this specialty.

He retired in 1993.

Later life and death
He made model boats and wrote a book on the topic that was published in 2005: Scottish fishing vessels of the nineteenth century, a guide to building scale model boats.

After a long illness, he died on 26 August 2007.

References

1933 births
2007 deaths
20th-century Scottish medical doctors
Scottish general practitioners
Fellows of the Royal College of General Practitioners
Fellows of the Royal College of Physicians and Surgeons of Glasgow
Alumni of the University of Edinburgh
Academics of the University of Glasgow
20th-century surgeons